Vexillum amentare is a species of sea snail, a marine gastropod mollusk, in the family Costellariidae, the ribbed miters.

Description
The length of the shell attains 23 mm.

Distribution
This species occurs in Philippines.

References

amentare
Gastropods described in 2017